Roupa Nova  (lit. "New Clothes") is a Brazilian soft rock band, who had many hits in the 1980s and early 1990s. Their sound is often compared to the American band Toto. The band sold over 10 million copies and have 25 hit singles, 10 of them reached #1.

The band was formed in 1970, under the name Os Famks, by keyboard player Cléberson Horsth, bassist Nando, guitarist Kiko and singer Paulinho. With this formation, the band released the single Hoje ainda é dia de Rock (Today is still the day for Rock). In 1975, having changed their name to Os Motokas, they were joined by keyboardist and guitarist Ricardo Feghali and drummer Serginho Herval.

After getting a record deal with Polygram, the band is renamed Roupa Nova ("new clothes" in Portuguese). The name was a suggestion of record producer Mariozinho Rocha. Their accessible yet sophisticated style, making extensive use of vocal harmonies made them a favourite of adult contemporary radio stations. Since the 1980s, Roupa Nova has had many hits in Brazil, such as Sapato Velho (Old Shoe), Anjo (Angel), Whisky-a-Go-Go, Linda Demais (So Beautiful), Volta pra Mim (Come back to me), Coração Pirata (Pirate Heart) and Videogame. They have also composed many themes for telenovelas produced by Globo TV.

Their album Roupa Nova em Londres, released in 2009, was recorded at Abbey Road Studios, London, England. The album won the Latin Grammy in the category Best Brazilian Contemporary Pop Album.
On December 14, 2020, the band lost lead singer Paulinho, a victim of COVID-19.

Discography
1981: Roupa Nova (1981)
1982: Roupa Nova (1982)
1983: Roupa Nova (1983)
1984: Roupa Nova (1984)
1985: Show de Rock'n Roll
1987: Herança
1988: Luz 
1990: Frente e Versos
1991: Ao Vivo
1992: The Best en Español
1993: De Volta ao Começo
1994: Vida Vida
1995: Novela Hits
1996: 6/1
1997: Através dos Tempos
1999: Agora Sim
2001: Ouro de Minas
2004: RoupaAcústico
2006: RoupaAcústico 2
2007: Natal Todo Dia
2008: 4U
2009: Roupa Nova em Londres
2010: Roupa Nova 30 anos
2012: Cruzeiro Roupa Nova
2013: Roupa Nova Music Edição Especial de Luxo (5 DVDs + 1 Ep) - digipack

Videography 
 (2004) RoupaAcústico
 (2006) RoupaAcústico 2
 (2009) Roupa Nova em Londres
 (2010) Roupa Nova 30 Anos ao Vivo
 (2012) Cruzeiro Roupa Nova
 (2016) Todo Amor do Mundo

References

External links

 

Brazilian rock music groups
Musical groups established in 1980
Latin Grammy Award winners
1980 establishments in Brazil